Marq Porciuncula (born January 29, 1987 in Hamburg, Germany) is a German singer, songwriter and occasional actor of Filipino descent.

Biography 
Marq Porciuncula was a prodigy in music and dance throughout his childhood. His growing interest in performing arts eventually led him to a casting for the German televised singing competition, Popstars, in July 2003. With over 13,000 participants, Marq was unexpectedly chosen and his life as a superstar unfolded.

On November 3, 2003 Meiko, Akay, Ken and Marq were launched as Overground and their first single "Schick mir nen Engel" simultaneously claimed the number one spot on the Media Control Charts in Germany, Austria and Switzerland and received a Gold record. Inevitably, their debut album "It's Done" eventually achieved a Platinum record. Within a few months, Overground succeeded in becoming the most popular and successful boy band within the territory.

After their last single "Hass Mich" Overground decided to take a break and Marq is now flying solo as he records his own songs and prepares himself to take a step further.

Discography

Albums 
 It's Done (2003) #1 GER
  2. OG (2004) #41 GER

Singles

Awards

2003
 Bravo Otto (Gold) - "Best Newcomer Band"

2004
 Bravo Otto (Silver) - "Best Band National"
 Goldene Stimmgabel - "Best Newcomer Band"
 Goldener Pinguin - "Best Newcomer Band"
 Goldene Schallplatte - "TV Allstars"
 Goldene Schallplatte - "Schick mir 'nen Engel"
 Platin Schallplatte - "It's Done"

Nomination

2003
 Goldene Schallplatte

2004
 Comet
 New Faces Award
 Echo
 Jetix Kids Award
 Goldene Schallplatte

External links
 
 
 

1987 births
Living people
21st-century German male singers
German songwriters